Nicolas Joseph Hanauer (born September 2, 1959) is an American entrepreneur and venture capitalist.

Business career 

Hanauer was born to a secular Jewish family in New York City and raised in Bellevue, Washington. His brother is Adrian Hanauer, majority owner of Seattle Sounders FC and a minority owner of the Seattle Kraken. After earning a philosophy degree from the University of Washington, Hanauer began to work at family-owned Pacific Coast Feather Company, where he served as co-chair and CEO. In the 1980s, he co-founded Museum Quality Framing Company, a large West Coast franchise.

In the 1990s, Hanauer was an early investor in Amazon.com, where he served as an adviser until 2000. He founded gear.com, which eventually merged with Overstock.com, and Avenue A Media, which was acquired by Microsoft in 2007 (under the name aQuantive) for $6.4 billion. He has managed, founded, or financed over 30 companies across a broad range of industries including manufacturing, retailing, e-commerce, digital media and advertising, software, aerospace, health care, and finance, including Insitu Group (purchased by Boeing for $400 million), and Market Leader (purchased by Trulia in 2013 for $350 million).

In 2000, Hanauer co-formed the Seattle-based venture capital company, Second Avenue Partners which "looks to invest in promising teams and transformational ideas in a wide range of areas including internet, consumer and social media, software, and clean energy." The company advises and funds early stage companies such as HouseValues, Qliance, and Newsvine.

In 2018, the brothers sold Pacific Coast Feather.

Civic activism 

Hanauer is co-founder of The True Patriot Network, a progressive think tank framed upon the ideas he and Eric Liu presented in their 2007 book espousing patriotic progressivism, The True Patriot. Hanauer and his wife, Leslie, co-manage The Nick and Leslie Hanauer Foundation "which focuses on public education and the environment, and additionally supports a variety of progressive causes locally and nationally." Their foundation has supported Seattle Art Museum, Seattle Center Fund, Progress Alliance of Washington, whose vision is a "Washington State that is a healthy place to live with shared economic success and security, and a democracy that works for its people,"  and Woodland Park Zoo. The couple has also supported the Seattle chapter of the United Way.

Hanauer is active in the Seattle community and Washington's public education system. He co-founded the League of Education Voters (LEV), a non-partisan political organization dedicated to improving the quality of public education in Washington. He also serves on the boards of Cascade Land Conservancy, The University of Washington Foundation. Hanauer appeared in the Robert Reich documentary Inequality for All.

In the wake of the Sandy Hook shooting, Hanauer co-founded the Washington Alliance for Gun Responsibility, whose mission is to "put forward and support commonsense solutions to reduce gun violence." The organization has been the primary backer for several Ballot Initiatives in Washington State. Initiative 594, which expanded state background check laws to all gun purchases. Initiative 1491, authorizing courts to issue extreme risk protection orders to remove an individual's access to firearms. Initiative 1639, to implement restrictions on the purchase and ownership of firearms including raising the minimum age to purchase a gun to 21, adding background checks, increasing waiting periods, and enacting storage requirements.

In June 2014, Hanauer wrote an op-ed for Politico magazine in which he foresaw pitchforks coming for his "fellow .01%ers" if they did not address the issue of increasing wealth inequality. He noted how it would result in the destruction of the middle class and damage to the wealthy class. He made comparisons to the period preceding the French Revolution in the 18th century. Hanauer continues this theme in his podcast, 'Pitchfork Economics with Nick Hanauer'.

In 2015, Hanauer founded Civic Ventures and Civic Action, "a group of political troublemakers devoted to ideas, policies, and actions that catalyze significant social change. By thinking, writing, and acting outside the realm of conventional political discourse, Civic Ventures drives the economic conversation and fundamentally alters the status quo in Seattle, Washington state, and the United States."

Hanauer has been a vocal advocate of increasing the minimum wage to $15 an hour, helping to kick off the nationwide movement that has increased the minimum wage in 21 states. In 2013, "as striking fast-food workers across the country began rallying around calls for $15 an hour, Hanauer and David Rolf, a labor leader, kicked off an organizing drive in the small airport community of SeaTac, Washington, that resulted in the country’s first law mandating a $15 minimum wage." In 2014, Hanauer was a member of Seattle's Income Inequality Advisory Group which proposed and eventually passed the $15 minimum wage. In 2016, Hanauer was the largest contributor to Washington State Initiative 1433 which supported "incrementally raising the state's minimum wage from $9.47 to $13.50 by 2020 and mandating employers to offer paid sick leave."

TED Talk controversy 

In May 2012, several online news outlets reported that Hanauer's March 1, 2012, TED talk on inequality had not been posted online by TED Talks. In that short presentation, he criticized what he called "an article of faith for Republicans", namely the assertion that "if taxes on the rich go up, job creation will go down", saying:

Thus, he proposed the necessity for higher median incomes for workers rather than tax breaks for the wealthy:

As justification for not posting the talk, Chris Anderson, curator of TED, stated that he felt Hanauer's talk was "explicitly partisan" and included a number of arguments such as his "apparent ruling out of  initiative as a root cause of job creation." Moreover, he said, the live TED audience had given the talk mediocre reviews. Huffington Post writer Jillian Berman expressed bewilderment since TED had previously issued talks by politicians such as former U.S. Vice-President Al Gore or British Prime Minister David Cameron without hesitation. Forbes managing editor Bruce Upbin noted that a chart featured in Hanauer's talk displayed incorrect data, showing unemployment increasing steadily from 5.6% in 1995 to 9.3% in 2009, while in reality unemployment had been below 5% as recently as early 2008.

TED reserves the right to post only the talks it considers to be most effective. Hanauer partially defended Anderson's decision in an interview with Sam Seder, saying he could understand that the position he himself offered in his talk might be controversial to the business community and that Anderson might have received disproportionate criticism for his decision to hold back the talk. The original presentation is available on YouTube.

Anderson later decided to add Hanauer's most recent, and longer, talk on a similar theme from TEDSalon NY2014. It was posted on August 12, 2014. Anderson also posted an explanation for his decision and showed himself and Hanauer "burying the hatchet.".  His July 2019 talk, "The dirty secret of capitalism— and a new way forward" is available on TED Talks' YouTube channel.  In it he does not explicitly mention any political party but rather calls out the faults of “neo-liberal economic theory” and highlights alternative economic hypotheses.

Selected publications

Books 
 The True Patriot (with Eric Liu), Sasquatch Books, 2007.
 The Gardens of Democracy (with Eric Liu), Sasquatch Books, 2011.

References

External links 

 
 

Businesspeople from Seattle
University of Washington College of Arts and Sciences alumni
American venture capitalists
1959 births
Living people
Giving Pledgers
21st-century philanthropists
The Atlantic (magazine) people
American chief executives
Jewish American philanthropists
21st-century American Jews